Crowns Down & Company (stylized as CrownsDown & Company) is a remix album by American hip hop duo Themselves. It includes remixes of songs from the duo's third studio album Crowns Down. It was released on Anticon in 2010.

Critical reception
Timothy Archer of The 405 gave the album a 7 out of 10, saying, "CrownsDown & Company will probably appeal more to the partisan audience than new listeners searching for an entrance point into Themselves' canon, but it represents a fine addition to that collection, and will no doubt give fans and club-goers many moments of happiness, curiosity and dancing."

Track listing

References

External links
 

2010 remix albums
Themselves albums
Anticon albums